FK Dojransko Ezero Nov Dojran is a football club based in the town of Nov Dojran, North Macedonia. They are currently competing in the Macedonian Third League (South Division).

History
The club was founded in 1978. Their biggest accomplishment was playing in the Macedonian Second League.

External links
Club info at MacedonianFootball 
Hotel Istatov 
MakFudbal 
Football Federation of Macedonia 

Football clubs in North Macedonia
FK Dojransko Ezero
Association football clubs established in 1978
1978 establishments in the Socialist Republic of Macedonia